John Lampkin Taylor (March 7, 1805 – September 6, 1870) was a U.S. Representative from Ohio for four terms from 1847 to 1855.

Biography 
Born in Stafford County, near Fredericksburg, Virginia, Taylor completed preparatory studies.
He studied law in Washington, D.C..
He was admitted to the bar in 1828 and commenced practice in Chillicothe, Ohio, in 1829.
He served as a major general in the State militia for several years.

Taylor was elected as a Whig to the Thirtieth and to the three succeeding Congresses (March 4, 1847 – March 3, 1855).
He served as a clerk in the United States Department of the Interior from May 1, 1870, until his sudden death at his desk in Washington, D.C., September 6, 1870.
He was interred in the family burying ground on the Taylor ancestral estate, "Mansfield," near Louisa, Virginia.

Sources

1805 births
1870 deaths
Politicians from Fredericksburg, Virginia
Politicians from Chillicothe, Ohio
Ohio lawyers
American militia generals
Whig Party members of the United States House of Representatives from Ohio
19th-century American politicians
19th-century American lawyers